Tendra may refer to:

Gulf (or Bay) of Tendra, Black Sea
Spit (or Island) of Tendra, scene of Russian-Turkish naval battle
Battle of Tendra, fought on 8 and 9 September 1790 in the Black Sea
TenDRA Compiler